Clive Nolan (born 30 June 1961) is a British musician, composer and producer who has played a prominent role in the development of progressive rock. He has been the regular keyboard player in Pendragon (1986–present), Shadowland (1992–present), Strangers on a Train (1993–1994) and Arena (1995–present), as well as writing lyrics for Arena and producing or co-producing several other bands' albums.

At the age of sixteen, Nolan became the youngest musician in England (at the time) to gain an A.L.C.M. composition diploma from the London College of Music.

In 1982, Nolan won the cup and two medals at the composers competition in the Cheltenham Music Festival.

Nolan is a music graduate, holding both a B Mus and M Mus. He played violin, cello and viola, although his main study while at university was composition, orchestration, musical arrangement and conducting.

In 2008 Nolan's rock opera, She, was filmed for DVD in Katowice, Poland. In 2010 the show was again performed in Santa Cruz, Bolivia. Since then, Nolan has started the Caamora Theatre Company,

Musicals 
Besides his progressive rock ventures, Nolan has written a rock-opera, She based upon the novel by Sir H Rider Haggard. In 2008, it was filmed for DVD in Katowice, Poland. In 2010, the show was again performed in Santa Cruz, Bolivia. Since then Nolan has started the Caamora Theatre Company, and turned She into a full musical, which was performed for the first time at The Playhouse in Cheltenham in 2012.

Nolan's musical Alchemy finished its run at the Jermyn Street Theatre in the West End of London in August 2014. The libretto is based on the composer's original story. He created a sequel entitled King's Ransom in 2017. Both musicals have now taken the first step towards becoming full theatrical-release feature films.

Writing 
He wrote the lyrics for the 43-minute metal song "Crimson II" by Edge of Sanity, which came out in 2003.

In 2005, Nolan wrote a novel called Mephisto Bridge which is as yet unpublished.

Awards 
Classic Rock Society Best Keyboard Player award won in the years: 1995, 1996, 1998, 2005, 2009, 2010 and 2011.
Honorary Visitor to Santa Cruz, Bolivia, award received in 2010 from Bolivian government for his theatre work in Santa Cruz.

Discography

With Arena

With Pendragon

With Shadowland

With Caamora 
 Clive Nolan & Agnieszka Swita – Closer – CD – 2006 
 Caamora – Walk on Water (Mini-Album) – CD – 2007 
 Caamora – "Embrace" (Single) – CD – 2008  
 Caamora – Journey's End... An Acoustic Anthology – 2CD – 2008 
 Caamora – She – 2CD / 2CD Digipak / 3LP – 2008 
 Caamora – She (Live) – DVD / DVD+2CD / 2CD – 2008 
 Caamora – She (The Definitive Edition) – 2CD+2DVD+2CD – 2008 
 Alchemy the Musical (2013) (CD/DVD/ box set)
 King's Ransom (2017) (CD box set)

With Strangers on a Train 
 The Key – Part 1 – The Prophecy – Verglas 1990
 The Key – Part 2 – The Labyrinth – Verglas 1993

With Clive Nolan and Oliver Wakeman 
 Jabberwocky – Verglas 1999
 The Hound of the Baskervilles – Verglas 2002
 Dark Fables - Elflock Records 2021 
 Tales by Gaslight – compilation of first 3 albums -  Elflock Records 2021

With Casino 
 Casino – Verglas 1992

With Barrett 
 A Rush of Adrenaline (dDVD2006)

With Neo 
 Broadcast (DVD) – Metal Mind 2007

With Clive Nolan 
 Skeletons in the Cupboard -Archive – Vol 1 – Verglas 2003
 Hidden Treasure (2015)
 Song of the Wildlands (2021)

With China Zorilla and Noel Calcaterra (story by Elizeth Schluk) 
 Otra Vida (2011)

With Gandalf's Fist 
 A Forest of Fey 2014

References

External links 

 
 [ Clive Nolan] at Allmusic
 Official Caamora website
 Official She the musical website

1961 births
Living people
British rock keyboardists
British record producers
British male singers
Arena (band) members
Pendragon (band) members